Rear-Admiral William Charles Chamberlain (21 April 1818 – 27 February 1878) was a rear admiral in the Royal Navy.

Family
He was the eldest son of the diplomat Sir Henry Chamberlain, 1st Baronet, by his second wife Anne Eugenia née Morgan.

Chamberlain married, firstly, Elizabeth Jane (d. 29 August 1856), daughter of the naval officer, traveller, and author Captain Basil Hall.  They had 3 children, Basil Hall Chamberlain (1850–1935), a Japanologist, Henry Chamberlain (1853–1923), a lieutenant-commander in the Royal Navy, and Houston Stewart Chamberlain (1855–1927), the natural historian and author, classified in the Oxford Dictionary of National Biography as a "racialist writer".

Chamberlain married, secondly, Sarah Morgan Holroyd (d. 29 December 1921), daughter of Thomas Holroyd on 29 October 1872. They had a daughter, Harriett Sarah Chamberlain, who died unmarried on 17 March 1939.

Royal Navy service
Chamberlain was promoted to lieutenant in November 1840 and to commander on 22 October 1844. He was the Superintendent of Chatham Dockyard from 1868 to 1874, and was promoted to the rank of rear admiral on 19 January 1874.

Death
Chamberlain died on 27 February 1878.

References

Further reading
 
 Burke's Peerage, Baronetage and Knightage, edited by Peter Townend, 105th edition, London, 1970.

1818 births
1878 deaths
Royal Navy rear admirals
Younger sons of baronets